Kalishom or Kalisham or Kelishom  may refer to:
 Kalisham, Gilan
 Kalishom, Mazandaran
 Kalisham Rural District, in Gilan Province